As You Sow is a non-profit foundation chartered to promote corporate social responsibility (for example on human rights) through shareholder advocacy, coalition building, and legal strategies.

History
As You Sow was founded in 1992 and has five program areas for addressing its environmental and social concerns: Energy, Environmental Health, Waste, Power of the Proxy, and Human Rights. Most of As You Sow's Programs include shareholder advocacy to pressure companies to adopt its desired policies. According to As You Sow, "Shareholder advocacy leverages the power of stock ownership in publicly traded companies to promote environmental, social, and governance change from within."

Under the Environmental Health Program, As You Sow's Toxic Enforcement Initiative seeks to reduce and remove carcinogenic exposures by pursuing compliance with California's Safe Drinking Water and Toxic Enforcement Act.

Engagements with corporations
Dunkin' Donuts announced they would remove titanium dioxide from their powdered donuts after being pressured by As You Sow. The company had been adding the ingredient to make the donuts appear more brightly white, while As You Sow had alleged that the additive was a nanomaterial with unknown health effects that could cause damage to DNA when consumed. The company said they disagreed with the allegations, but would nevertheless remove the ingredient from their recipe.

With a coalition of other investment organizations, As You Sow has pressed oil and gas companies to disclose and address the risks of hydraulic fracturing ("fracking"). Since 2005, As You Sow has collaborated on Proxy Preview, providing an annual overview of hundreds of shareholder proposals.

Through its Energy Program, As You Sow has engaged supermajor oil companies, including ExxonMobil, which for the first time issue a report about corporate assets that could be at risk from climate change.

As You Sow regularly publishes reports on issues relating to corporate social responsibility, including executive compensation and recyclable packaging in the food and beverage industries.

As You Sow grades mutual funds on climate change, deforestation, militarism, mass incarceration, gender equality, tobacco, and guns.

Awards
In 2010, As You Sow received the California Stewardship Bow and Arrow Award for Coalition Building, from the California Product Stewardship Council, for its engagement of the three largest U.S. beverage companies (the Coca Cola Company, PepsiCo, and Nestle Waters North America), leading each to commit to recycling a majority of their post-consumer containers over the following six years.

See also
Socially responsible investing

References

External links

Organizations established in 1992
Business ethics organizations
Environmental organizations based in the United States
Non-profit organizations based in the United States
1992 establishments in the United States